Adler was an American rock supergroup from Los Angeles, California, formed in 2011 by former Guns N' Roses drummer Steven Adler. The band was formed following the dissolution of Adler's previous band, Adler's Appetite, and consisted of Adler along with current Lynam and former Mars Electric vocalist/guitarist Jacob Bunton, guitarist Lonny Paul (now also of Lynam), and L.A. Guns bassist Johnny Martin.

History
The band was formed in 2011 after the dissolution of Adler's previous band Adler's Appetite. The band's album, Back from the Dead, was released November 26, 2012 via New Ocean Media. During an interview, Jacob Bunton said that their producer Jeff Pilson "is like a 5th member of the band, he's brought out so much and help channel the songs", and "he brings so much to the table as a producer, a member and a bassist, he has the same passion that he has been performing into the studio". Steven Adler has said "My goal is to take this band into the Rock and Roll Hall of Fame in 25 years, I want to be a part of a team, like the Rolling Stones, Aerosmith, or Rush. These guys are buddies and love making music together, it's cool to be part of a gang".

An American tour was initiated early in 2013, with a European tour scheduled for the fall of that year. However, these plans were curtailed when Steven Adler entered rehabilitation in May 2013, and the band entered hiatus. The band returned to active service in 2015, undertaking a US tour in the summer of that year. In 2016 the band performed at the M3 and the Monsters of Rock West Coast Cruise. These proved to be the band's last performances however, as in February 2017 Steven Adler revealed that the band had dissolved as a result of his disinterest in performing concerts with low attendances. In 2018 Steven Adler reformed his old band Adler's Appetite with a new lineup.

Personnel
 Steven Adler – drums, percussion 
 Jacob Bunton – lead vocals, guitars, mandolin, keyboards, piano
 Johnny Martin – bass, vocals
 Lonny Paul – guitars, vocals

Discography
Back from the Dead (2012)

References

External links

2011 establishments in California
Guns N' Roses
Musical groups disestablished in 2016
Musical groups established in 2011
Musical groups from Los Angeles